Sovereign is an EP by Californian band Neurosis. As with the previous album, Times of Grace (and each Neurosis album since) it was recorded by Steve Albini at Electric Audio in Chicago, Illinois. The CD contains a mixed-media CD-Rom portion featuring visuals and music reminiscent of their live shows and their work under the Tribes of Neurot moniker. 
In 2011 Neurot Recordings released a reissue that includes bonus track "Misgiven".

Track listing

Personnel
Steve Von Till – guitar, vocals
Scott Kelly – guitar, vocals
Dave Edwardson – bass, vocals
Noah Landis – keyboards, vocals
Jason Roeder – drums
 Dave Collins - mastering

References

2000 EPs
Neurosis (band) albums
Albums produced by Steve Albini
Albums with cover art by Aaron Turner

pl:Sovereign